Jagtial district is a district located in the northern region of the Indian state of Telangana. Its headquarters is Jagtial. The district shares boundaries with Nirmal, Mancherial, Karimnagar, Peddapalli, Sircilla and Nizamabad districts.

Geography 

Jagtial district shares it boundaries with Nirmal district and Mancherial district on North and North East respectively, it is bounded on South and South West by Karimnagar district and Peddapalli district respectively and on the West by Nizamabad district

Demographics 
 Census of India, the district has a population of 988,913. Scheduled Castes and Scheduled Tribes make up 16.68% and 2.36% of the population respectively.

At the time of the 2011 census, 90.93% of the population spoke Telugu and 7.14% Urdu as their first language.

Administrative divisions 
The district has three revenue divisions of Jagtial, Korutla and Metpally, which are sub-divided into 18 mandals.

Mandals 

The below table categorizes mandals into their respective revenue divisions in the district:

Notable People 
Duvvasi Mohan Actor and comedian in Telugu cinema

Venu Sriram Film director in Tollywood 

Harish Shankar  Film director in Tollywood

Alishetti Prabhakar, writer and painter

Milkuri Gangavva, YouTuber Comedian Actress in Telugu Cinema

 Rohith Vakrala, Socio-Political Activist, Analyst, Policy Enthusiast 

T Jeevan Reddy politician, MLC, Ex R&B Minister

L Ramana politician from TRS Party, MLC
 
 Vamshi Paidipally  Film Director in Tollywood
 Dr M Sanjay Kumar, politician Member of Legislative Assembly from 2018

National Highways 

NH563 Jagtiyal - Karimnagar - Warangal - Khammam

NH63 Latur- Nizamabad - Jagtiyal - Mancherial - Bijapur Jagdalpur

NH61 Bhiwandi  - Ahmadnagar - Nanded - Nirmal - Jagtiyal

See also 
 List of districts in Telangana

References

External links 
 Official website

Districts of Telangana